

Graphosoma is a genus bugs in the family Pentatomidae. They are commonly known as striped shield bugs for their distinctive markings.

Species

Subgenus Graphosoma
Graphosoma alkani Lodos, 1959
Graphosoma consimile Horváth, 1903
Graphosoma interruptum White, 1839
Graphosoma italicum (Müller, 1766)
Graphosoma lineatum (Linnaeus, 1758)
Graphosoma melanoxanthum Horváth, 1903
Graphosoma rubrolineatum (Westwood, 1837)
Graphosoma semipunctatum (Fabricius, 1775)
Graphosoma stali Horváth, 1881

Subgenus Graphosomella
Graphosoma inexpectatum Carapezza & Jindra, 2008

References

 Carapezza, A.; Jindra, Z. 2008: Graphosoma (Graphosomella subgen. nov.) inexpectatum sp. nov. from Syria (Hemiptera Heteroptera Pentatomidae). Naturalista siciliano (4), 32(3-4): 471–478. Full article (PDF)
 Dai, J.-x. 2005: Discussion on classification of genus Grophosoma [Graphosoma] and Dybowskyia based on sequences of cytochrome b gene (Hemiptera: Pentatomidae). Sichuan journal of zoology, 24(4): 490–495.
 Fent, M.; Dursun, A.; Tezcan, S. 2013: First record of Graphosoma inexpectatum (Hemiptera, Pentatomidae, Podopinae) from Turkey with description of the female. ZooKeys, 319: 51–57. 

Podopinae
Pentatomomorpha genera
Taxa named by François-Louis Laporte, comte de Castelnau